The Electronics Building is a historic building in Shenzhen, China, located in Shennan Middle Road. The building was started in 1981 and completed in August the following year. 

It is the first-generation headquarters building of Shenzhen CEC Group (the branch of China Electronics Corporation in Shenzhen) and was the first high-rise building after Shenzhen was established. It is named after the electronics industry.

From the 1980s to the early 1990s, it was a local landmark. A large electronics industry emerged surrounding the building. The building has also become the "first street of China's electronics".

See also
Shenzhen speed
Shun Hing Square
SEG Plaza
Guomao Building
List of tallest buildings in Shenzhen

References

Futian District
Buildings and structures in Shenzhen
Office buildings completed in 1982
Retail buildings in China